Long Mountain is a mountain on the outskirts of Kingston, Jamaica. Parts of it are also known as Wareika or Wareika Hills. It has been the site of a residence and later a Rastafarian commune of Count Ossie. Nyabinghi drummers from his Camp David commune have been featured on recordings, including a popular version of Oh Carolina.

See also
Man from Wareika

References

Kingston, Jamaica
Mountains of Jamaica